A Plus Tard (foaled 6 February 2014) is a French-bred thoroughbred racehorse competing in National Hunt racing.

Career
A Plus Tard was bred in France by Mme Henri Devin and raced five times in the country in 2017 and 2018, never finishing outside of the top three. A Plus Tard won twice, at Saint-Brieuc and Auteuil. In May 2018, A Plus Tard was gelded and in October of that year the horse was sold privately to Cheveley Park Stud and moved to Henry De Bromhead in Ireland.

A Plus Tard made his debut for the new owner and trainer combination at Gowran Park in November 2018, finishing second in a 2m4f chase. The following month, taking victory at Naas before finishing second in a Grade 3 at Punchestown.  A Plus Tard had a first Cheltenham Festival victory in March 2019, winning the Close Brothers Novices' Handicap Chase.  He would finish third in the Grade 1 Dooley Insurance Group Champion Novice Chase the following month at Punchestown.

A Plus Tard won his first Grade 1 at Leopardstown in December 2019, in the Paddy's Rewards Club "Loyalty's Dead, Live For Rewards" Chase. A return to Cheltenham in March yielded third in the Ryanair Chase behind eventual winner, Min.  In December 2020, A Plus Tard returned to Leopardstown and won the Grade 1 Savills Chase before making a Cheltenham Gold Cup debut finishing second behind Minella Indo.

After a lengthy off-season break, A Plus Tard returned at Haydock in November winning the Betfair Chase. At Leopardstown, he was beaten second in the Savills Chase by Galvin. In March, A Plus Tard returned to Cheltenham and won the Cheltenham Gold Cup by 15 lengths.

References

External links
  – A Plus Tard Race Form

2014 racehorse births
Cheltenham Festival winners
Racehorses trained in Ireland
National Hunt racehorses
Cheltenham_Gold_Cup_winners